WPMT, virtual channel 43 (UHF digital channel 36), is a Fox-affiliated television station licensed to York, Pennsylvania, United States, and serving the Susquehanna Valley region (Harrisburg–Lancaster–Lebanon–York). The station is owned by McLean, Virginia–based Tegna Inc. WPMT's studios are located on South Queen Street in Spring Garden Township (with a York mailing address), and it shares transmitter facilities with Harrisburg-licensed PBS member station WITF-TV (channel 33) in Susquehanna Township. It is also rebroadcast on a translator, W34FM-D in Chambersburg, Pennsylvania.

History

Early history
The station first signed on the air on December 21, 1952, as WSBA-TV, originally operating as an ABC affiliate. It was owned by the Susquehanna Radio Corporation, a subsidiary of the Susquehanna Pfaltzgraff conglomerate, along with radio station WSBA (910 AM). It was one of the first commercially licensed UHF television stations in the United States, signing on the air just over three months after KPTV in Portland, Oregon which originally broadcast on channel 27 when it signed on in 1952, before moving to VHF channel 12 five years later. This makes WPMT the second-oldest continuously broadcasting UHF station in the country, only behind WSBT-TV in South Bend, Indiana (although WSBT moved from its original channel 34 to channel 22 in the late 1950s, making WPMT the oldest UHF station that broadcasts continuously on the same virtual channel number to this day).

In 1963, the station became a CBS affiliate and joined WHP-TV (channel 21) in Harrisburg and WLYH-TV (channel 15) in Lebanon to form the Keystone Network. The three stations provided a strong combined signal with about a 55% overlap. Initially, WHP-TV, WLYH, and WSBA aired the same programming despite separate ownership. By the late 1960s, while all three stations ran most of the CBS programming schedule, WHP-TV ran different local programming during non-network hours, while WLYH and WSBA continued to simulcast for nearly the entire broadcast day. WHP ran CBS shows that WSBA and WLYH preempted, while the latter two stations ran programming that WHP preempted, allowing most of the market to view the entire CBS schedule. All three ran most of the CBS lineup, duplicating over three-quarters of the network's programs. This arrangement was necessary for the days before cable gained significant penetration.

In April 1983, Susquehanna sold WSBA-TV to Idaho-based Mohawk Broadcasting, who changed its call letters to the current WPMT. The station signed off in August and returned to the air the following month as the Susquehanna Valley's first general entertainment independent station. Until then, the only over-the-air source of non-network programming in South Central Pennsylvania was WGCB-TV (channel 49) in Red Lion, a religious station that had been on the air since 1979. WPMT was a typical UHF independent with a schedule heavy on cartoons, sitcoms, movies, dramas, sports and westerns.

As a Fox affiliate
In 1986, Mohawk sold the station to Renaissance Broadcasting. On October 9, 1986, WPMT became one of the charter affiliates of the newly launched Fox network. From 1990 to 2004, WPMT featured original children's programming hosted by the station's mascot, a clown named Pete McTee (a play on the station's call letters). The station was acquired by Tribune Broadcasting following the company's purchase of Renaissance in 1996. A year earlier, WPMT had added programming from The WB, half-owned by Tribune, in off-hours. However, cable customers could watch the full WB schedule on sister station WPHL-TV from Philadelphia.

The station's newscasts were seen in a fictional sense in the 2010 film Unstoppable, which is set in the station's market area.

Aborted sale to Sinclair Broadcast Group
On May 8, 2017, Hunt Valley, Maryland–based Sinclair Broadcast Group—which has owned WHP-TV since 2012, through its acquisition of several television stations owned by Newport Television—entered into an agreement to acquire Tribune Media for $3.9 billion, plus the assumption of $2.7 billion in debt held by Tribune. However, Sinclair was precluded from acquiring WPMT directly, as both WHP and WPMT rank among the four highest-rated stations in the Harrisburg–Lancaster–Lebanon–York market in total day viewership, and there are too few independently owned full-power stations in the Susquehanna Valley area to permit legal duopolies in any event. On April 24, 2018, Sinclair announced that it would sell WPMT and eight other stations – Sinclair-operated KOKH-TV in Oklahoma City, WRLH-TV in Richmond, KDSM-TV in Des Moines, WOLF-TV (along with LMA partners WSWB and WQMY) in Scranton/Wilkes-Barre and WXLV-TV in Greensboro/Winston-Salem/High Point, and Tribune-owned WXMI in Grand Rapids—to Standard Media Group (an independent broadcast holding company formed by private equity firm Standard General to assume ownership of and absolve ownership conflicts involving the aforementioned stations) for $441.1 million.

Three weeks after the FCC's July 18 vote to have the deal reviewed by an administrative law judge amid "serious concerns" about Sinclair's forthrightness in its applications to sell certain conflict properties, on August 9, 2018, Tribune announced it would terminate the Sinclair deal, intending to seek other M&A opportunities. Tribune also filed a breach of contract lawsuit in the Delaware Chancery Court, alleging that Sinclair engaged in protracted negotiations with the FCC and the DOJ over regulatory issues, refused to sell stations in markets where it already had properties, and proposed divestitures to parties with ties to Sinclair executive chair David D. Smith that were rejected or highly subject to rejection to maintain control over stations it was required to sell. The termination of the Sinclair sale agreement places uncertainty for the future of Standard Media's purchases of WPMT and the other six Tribune- and Sinclair-operated stations included in that deal, which were predicated on the closure of the Sinclair–Tribune merger.

Sale to Nexstar Media Group and resale to Tegna
On December 3, 2018, Irving, Texas–based Nexstar Media Group—which has owned ABC affiliate WHTM-TV (channel 27) since January 2017—announced it would acquire the assets of Tribune Media for $6.4 billion in cash and debt. Nexstar was precluded from acquiring WPMT directly or indirectly, as FCC regulations prohibit common ownership of two or more of the four highest-rated stations in the same media market. (Furthermore, any attempt by Nexstar to assume the operations of WPMT through local marketing or shared services agreements would have been subject to regulatory hurdles that could have delayed completion of the FCC and Justice Department's review and approval process for the acquisition.) As such, Nexstar was required to sell either WPMT or WHTM to a separate, unrelated company to address the ownership conflict. On March 20, 2019, McLean, Virginia–based Tegna Inc. announced it would purchase WPMT from Nexstar upon consummation of the merger, as part of the company's sale of nineteen Nexstar- and Tribune-operated stations to Tegna and the E. W. Scripps Company in separate deals worth $1.32 billion; along with Scranton sister station WNEP-TV (which was also acquired by Tegna as part of the spin-offs), this would make WPMT among the first television properties in Pennsylvania for Tegna. The sale was consummated on September 19, 2019.

News operation
WPMT presently broadcasts 47 hours of locally produced newscasts each week (with nine hours each weekday and one hour each on Saturdays and Sundays); in regards to the number of hours devoted to news programming, it is the highest local newscast output of any television station in the Harrisburg–Lancaster–Lebanon–York market.

As a CBS affiliate, WSBA-TV ran a small news department branded as NewsWatch 43. In 1980, the station relaunched its news department as a much larger operation, and retitled its newscasts to TeleJournal News. The station's signal prevented the competitive newscast from being seen throughout the market, however, preventing it from adequately competing against the established news departments of the other local Big Three network affiliates in the Susquehanna Valley (including NBC affiliate and longtime market leader WGAL, ABC affiliate WHTM, fellow CBS affiliates WHP-TV and WLYH); as a result, the news department was discontinued in 1983.

With Fox preparing to heighten its profile once Fox took over the contractual rights to the National Football Conference television package in the Fall of 1994 (as part of December 1993 contract deal with the NFL that transferred the NFC contract from CBS), Fox began urging management at owned-and-operated and affiliated stations that had limited to no local news presence to develop full-scale news departments. Renaissance Broadcasting agreed to Fox's request and commenced development of a full-scale news department for Channel 43. Long-form newscasts would return to WPMT on September 12, 1994, when the station premiered its flagship prime time newscast, Fox 43 News at Ten. Originally airing Monday through Fridays for a half-hour, it was first anchored by Evan Forrester and Donya Archer, who were accompanied by weather anchor Susan Schrack and sports director Tom Werme. (As of 2021, the weeknight editions of the 10:00 broadcast compete with prime time newscasts on CW affiliate WHP-DT3 [channel 21.3], and MeTV affiliate WGAL-DT2 [channel 8.2].) Half-hour Saturday and Sunday editions of the newscast were subsequently added on January 7, 1995; this was followed by the expansion of the weeknight editions of the newscast to one hour on September 13, 1997, with the weekend editions following suit on January 9, 1999.

News programming on Channel 43 expanded on January 16, 2006, with the addition of the Fox 43 Morning News, an hour-long weekday morning newscast at 7:00 a.m.; the newscast, which was formatted to feature updated traffic and weather segments in 10-minute intervals, gradually expanded within the next decade: the Morning News added two additional hours (expanding it to run from 5:00 to 8:00 a.m.) by September 2007 and expanded to include an 8:00 a.m. hour in September 2008. On February 13, 2013, WPMT expanded the weekday morning newscast to five hours (moving its start time one hour early to 4:00 a.m.), becoming the first and only station in the market, and the fifth Tribune-owned station to begin its morning newscast at 4:00 a.m. (WGAL and WHTM start their morning newscasts at 4:30, while WHP's continues to start at 5:00 a.m.) The weekday morning show later expanded to six hours (with the addition of a 9:00 a.m. block) on September 17, 2018.

On September 4, 2009, WPMT began airing a local sports highlight program called High School Football Frenzy, that airs Friday nights at 6:00 during the high school football season. On September 21, 2009, the station debuted a half-hour weeknight newscast at 6:30, that competed against the national network newscasts on WHP, WGAL, and WHTM. The station launched a weeknight 11:00 p.m. newscast on January 11, 2010.

On January 15, 2011, WPMT became the first station in Central Pennsylvania and the last Tribune-owned Fox affiliate to begin broadcasting its local newscasts in high definition (rival WGAL was the first station in the market to offer local newscasts in the 16:9 format, albeit in enhanced definition widescreen in mid-December 2010; WGAL switched to full HD on August 29, 2011). WPMT was the first television station in the market to provide news video from the field in true high definition, as it upgraded its ENG vehicles, satellite truck, studio and field cameras and other equipment in order to broadcast news footage from the field in high definition, in addition to segments broadcast from the main studio.

On January 9, 2012, WPMT expanded its early evening newscast to one hour with the addition of a half-hour at 6:00 p.m. WPMT debuted two hour-long newscasts at 4 and 5 p.m. weekdays on August 5, 2013, while discontinuing its hour-long 6:00 p.m. newscast. The station's 11:00 p.m. newscast was discontinued the following month on September 6, and was replaced by the second incarnation of The Arsenio Hall Show (which was produced by Tribune) three days later.

Technical information

Subchannels
The station's digital signal is multiplexed:

On October 26, 2009, WPMT launched a 24-hour news channel, known as "Fox 43 News 24/7", which is available on its second digital subchannel, and on Blue Ridge Communications digital channel 126 and Comcast digital channel 244. Programming consists of simulcasts and rebroadcasts of local news programming from the station's main channel. Beginning on January 1, 2011, WPMT began carrying the Tribune-owned network Antenna TV on digital subchannel 43.2. On July 18, 2015, WPMT began carrying This TV on digital subchannel 43.3, replacing the 24-hour news channel, known as "Fox 43 News 24/7". Fox 43 News 24/7 can still be viewed through a livestream link on their webpage. As part of a channel sharing agreement with WITF, the This TV subchannel on 43.3 was dropped.

Analog-to-digital conversion
WPMT discontinued regular programming on its analog signal, over UHF channel 43, on June 12, 2009, as part of the federally mandated transition from analog to digital television. The station's digital signal remained on its pre-transition UHF channel 47, using PSIP to display WPMT's virtual channel as 43 on digital television receivers.

WPMT sold its spectrum for $50 million in the 2016–2017 FCC incentive auction and the station will have to cease broadcasting on its current digital channel 90 days after it receives payment from the FCC. On August 31, 2017, it was announced that WPMT had entered into a channel sharing agreement with PBS member station WITF-TV.

References

External links

WPMT.AntennaTV.tv - Antenna TV Harrisburg official website
Livestream.com/WPMT/live - WPMT Livestream Page

Fox network affiliates
Antenna TV affiliates
Tegna Inc.
PMT
York, Pennsylvania
Television channels and stations established in 1952
1952 establishments in Pennsylvania